Schammel is a surname. Notable people with the surname include:

Fernand Schammel (1923–1961), Luxembourgian footballer
Zud Schammel (1910–1973), American football player